Judge Biggs may refer to:

Asa Biggs (1811–1878), judge of the United States District Court for the Albemarle, Cape Fear and Pamptico Districts of North Carolina
Caroline Biggs (fl. 1990s–2020s), judge of the High Court of Ireland
John Biggs Jr. (1895–1979), judge of the United States Court of Appeals for the Third Circuit
Loretta Copeland Biggs (born 1954), judge of the United States District Court for the Middle District of North Carolina